In mathematics and computer science, the right quotient (or simply quotient) of a language  with respect to language  is the language consisting of strings w such that wx is in  for some string x in  Formally:

Formally:

Example

Consider

and

Properties
Some common closure properties of the quotient operation include:

 The quotient of a regular language with any other language is regular.
 The quotient of a context free language with a regular language is context free.
 The quotient of two context free languages can be any recursively enumerable language.
 The quotient of two recursively enumerable languages is recursively enumerable.

These closure properties hold for both left and right quotients.

See also 

 Brzozowski derivative

References

Formal languages